Rerum novarum (from its incipit, with the direct translation of the Latin meaning "of revolutionary change"), or Rights and Duties of Capital and Labor, is an encyclical issued by Pope Leo XIII on 15 May 1891. It is an open letter, passed to all Catholic patriarchs, primates, archbishops and bishops, that addressed the condition of the working classes.

It discusses the relationships and mutual duties between labor and capital, as well as government and its citizens. Of primary concern is the need for some amelioration of "the misery and wretchedness pressing so unjustly on the majority of the working class". It supports the rights of labor to form unions, rejects both socialism and unrestricted capitalism, while affirming the right to private property.

Rerum Novarum is considered a foundational text of modern Catholic social teaching. Many of the positions in Rerum novarum are supplemented by later encyclicals, in particular Pius XI's Quadragesimo anno (1931), John XXIII's Mater et magistra (1961) and John Paul II's Centesimus annus (1991), each of which commemorates an anniversary of the publication of Rerum novarum.

Composition

The first draft and content of the encyclical was written by Tommaso Maria Zigliara, professor from 1870 to 1879 at the College of Saint Thomas (rector after 1873), a member of seven Roman congregations including the Congregation for Studies, and co-founder of the Academia Romano di San Tommaso in 1870. Zigliara's fame as a scholar at the forefront of the Thomist revival was widespread in Rome and elsewhere. "Zigliara also helped prepare the great encyclicals Aeterni Patris and Rerum novarum and strongly opposed traditionalism and ontologism in favor of the moderate realism of Aquinas."

The German theologian Wilhelm Emmanuel von Ketteler and the British Cardinal Henry Edward Manning were also influential in its composition.

Message 
Rerum novarum is subtitled "On the Conditions of Labor". In this document, Pope Leo XIII articulates the Catholic Church's response to the social conflict in the wake of capitalism and industrialization which had provoked socialist and communist movements and ideologies.

The pope declared that the role of the state is to promote justice through the protection of rights, while the church must speak out on social issues to teach correct social principles and ensure class harmony, calming class conflict. He restated the church's long-standing teaching regarding the crucial importance of private property rights, but recognized, in one of the best-known passages of the encyclical, that the free operation of market forces must be tempered by moral considerations:

Rerum novarum is remarkable for its vivid depiction of the plight of the nineteenth-century urban poor and for its condemnation of unrestricted capitalism. Among the remedies it prescribes are the formation of trade unions and the introduction of collective bargaining, particularly as an alternative to state intervention.

Although the encyclical follows traditional teaching concerning the rights and duties of property and the relations of employer and employee, it applies the old doctrines specifically to modern conditions (hence the title). Leo first quotes Thomas Aquinas in affirming that private property is a fundamental principle of natural law. He then quotes Gregory the Great regarding its proper use: ""He that hath a talent, let him see that he hide it not; he that hath abundance, let him quicken himself to mercy and generosity; he that hath art and skill, let him do his best to share the use and the utility hereof with his neighbor." Liberalism also affirms the right to private property, but socialism and communism greatly restrict or eliminate this right.

Rerum novarum also recognizes the special status of the poor in relation to social issues, expressing God's compassion and favor for them: this is elaborated in the modern Catholic principle of the "preferential option for the poor".

Criticism of Socialism 
Pope Leo XIII saw socialism as fundamentally flawed, seeking to replace rights and Catholic moral teaching with the ideology of state power. He believed that this would lead to the destruction of the family unit, where moral, productive individuals were taught and raised most successfully.

In the encyclical, the Pope says:4. To remedy these wrongs the socialists, working on the poor man's envy of the rich, are striving to do away with private property, and contend that individual possessions should become the common property of all, to be administered by the State or by municipal bodies. They hold that by thus transferring property from private individuals to the community, the present mischievous state of things will be set to rights, inasmuch as each citizen will then get his fair share of whatever there is to enjoy. But their contentions are so clearly powerless to end the controversy that were they carried into effect the working man himself would be among the first to suffer. They are, moreover, emphatically unjust, for they would rob the lawful possessor, distort the functions of the State, and create utter confusion in the community

Rights and duties 

To build social harmony, the pope proposes a framework of reciprocal rights and duties between workers and employers. Some of the duties of workers are:
 "fully and faithfully" to perform their agreed-upon tasks
 individually, to refrain from vandalism or personal violence
 collectively, to refrain from rioting and insurrection
Some of the duties of employers are:
 to provide work suited to each person's strength, gender, and age
 to respect the dignity of workers and not treat them as bondsmen
By reminding workers and employers of their rights and duties, the church can form and awaken their conscience. However, the pope also recommended that civil authorities act to protect workers' rights and to keep the peace. The law should intervene no further than necessary to stop abuses. In many cases, governments had acted solely to support the interests of businesses, while suppressing workers unions attempting to bargain for better working conditions.

Principles
The encyclical mentions several fundamental principles to guide relationships between capital and labor.

Dignity of the person
Leo states that "...according to natural reason and Christian philosophy, working for gain is creditable, not shameful, to a man, since it enables him to earn an honorable livelihood." He asserts that God has given human dignity to each person, creating them in God's image and endowing them with free will and immortal souls.

To respect their workers' dignity in the workplace, employers should: 
 give time off from work to worship God, and to fulfill family obligations;
 give periods of rest, not expecting work for long hours that preclude adequate sleep;
 not require work under unsafe conditions with danger of bodily harm;
 not require work under immoral conditions that endanger the soul;
 pay a fair daily wage, for which employees should give a full day's work.

The pope specifically mentions work in the mines, and outdoor work in certain seasons, as dangerous to health and requiring additional protections. He condemns the use of child labor as interfering with education and the development of children.

Fair wages are defined in Rerum novarum as at least a living wage, but Leo recommends paying enough to support the worker, his wife and family, with a little savings left over for the worker to improve his condition over time. He also prefers that women work at home.

Common good
Without recommending one form of government over another, Pope Leo puts forth principles for the appropriate role of the state. The primary purpose of a state is to provide for the common good. All people have equal dignity regardless of social class, and a good government protects the rights and cares for the needs of all its members, rich and poor. Everyone can contribute to the common good in some important way.

Leo asserts no one should be forced to share his goods; however, when one is blessed with material wealth, one has a duty to use this to benefit as many others as possible. The Catechism of the Catholic Church lists three principal aspects of the common good: 1) respect for the human person and his rights; 2) social well-being and development; and 3) peace, "the stability and security of a just order."

Subsidiarity
Pope Leo strongly criticizes socialism for seeking to replace the rights and duties of parents, families and communities with the central supervision of the state. The civil government should not intrude into the family, the basic building block of society. However, if a family finds itself in exceeding distress due to illness, injury, or natural disaster, this extreme necessity should be met with public aid, since each family is a part of the commonwealth. By the same token, if there occur a grave disturbance of mutual rights within a household, public authority should intervene to give each party its proper due. Authorities should only intervene when a family or community is unable or unwilling to fulfill its mutual rights and duties.

Rights and duties of property ownership

Preferential option for the poor 

Leo emphasizes the dignity of the poor and working classes.

This principle of the preferential option for the poor was developed more fully, in radically different ways, by later theologians and popes.

Right of association 

Leo distinguished the larger, civil society (the commonwealth, public society), and smaller, private societies within it. Civil society exists to protect the common good and preserve the rights of all equally. Private societies serve various special purposes within civil society. Trade unions are one type of private society, and a special focus of the encyclical: "The most important of all are workingmen's unions, for these virtually include all the rest.... [I]t were greatly to be desired that they should become more numerous and more efficient." Other private societies are families, business partnerships, and religious orders.

Leo strongly supported the right of private societies to exist and govern themselves:

Leo supported unions, yet opposed at least some parts of the then emerging labor movement. He urged workers, if their union seemed on the wrong track, to form alternative associations.

He deplored government suppression of religious orders and other Catholic organizations.

Influence and legacy 

Rerum novarum has been interpreted as both a criticism of the illusions of socialism and a primer of the Catholic response to the exploitation of workers.
The encyclical also contains a proposal for a living wage, although the text does not use this term: “Wages ought not to be insufficient to support a frugal and well-behaved wage-earner.” The U.S. theologian Msgr. John A. Ryan, a trained economist, elaborated the idea in his book A Living Wage (1906).
In Belgium, the encyclical is commemorated annually on the Catholic liturgical feast of the Ascension (a public holiday) by the Christian Labor Movement, traditionally linked to the (largely Catholic) Christian Democrat parties, as a kind of counterpart to the socialist Labor Day on May 1 (also a public holiday).
 The positions expressed by the fictional Bishop Morehouse at the beginning of Jack London’s The Iron Heel (The Iron Heel/Chapter II) are clearly derived from Rerum novarum.
 The Catholic Encyclopedia (1911), states that the document "has inspired a vast Catholic social literature, while many non-Catholics have acclaimed it as one of the most definite and reasonable productions ever written on the subject."
 In 2016, the left-wing periodical Jacobin judged that, from a socialist perspective, Rerum novarum was "uncomfortably" situated between laborers and industrialists, and that "it both opened up space for anticapitalist critique and severely restricted its horizons..."

Influence in Portugal 

With the regime established in Portugal under António de Oliveira Salazar in the 1930s, many key ideas from the encyclical were incorporated into Portuguese law. The Estado Novo ("New State") promulgated by Salazar accepted the idea of corporatism as an economic model, especially in labor relations. According to historian Howard J. Wiarda, its basic policies were deeply rooted in European Catholic social thought, especially those deriving from Rerum Novarum. Portuguese intellectuals, workers organizations and trade unions and other study groups were everywhere present after 1890 in many Portuguese Republican circles, as well as the conservative circles that produced Salazar. Wiarda concludes that the Catholic social movement was not only powerful in its own right but it also resonated with an older Portuguese political culture which emphasized a natural law tradition, patrimonialism, centralized direction and control, and the 'natural' orders and hierarchies of society.

See also 

 Class collaboration
 Corporatism
 Distributism
 Integralism
 List of encyclicals of Pope Leo XIII
 Political Catholicism

Footnotes

Sources 
 Rerum novarum, official English translation from the Vatican’s official website

References

Further reading 
Catholic Social Teaching by Anthony Cooney, John, C. Medaille, Patrick Harrington (Editor). 
Catholic Social Teaching, 1891-Present: A Historical, Theological, and Ethical Analysis by Charles E. Curran. Georgetown University Press, 2002. 
A Living Wage by Rev. John A. Ryan. Macmillan, NY, 1906.

External links 
 Full text of Rerum novarum English translation from the Vatican’s official website
 The Condition of Labor. Open letter to Pope Leo XIII by Henry George. 1891.
 Exposition of Rerum novarum with guided readings – see 4.2. At VPlater Project: online modules on Catholic Social Teaching

Documents of the Catholic Social Teaching tradition
1891 documents
1891 in Christianity
May 1891 events
Encyclicals of Pope Leo XIII
Distributism